The Dixon-Rhyne Project is an American jazz group from Indianapolis, Indiana.

The Dixon-Rhyne Project was formed in 2007 when tenor saxophonist Rob Dixon approached organist Melvin Rhyne, of Wes Montgomery Trio fame, about forming a boundary-pushing jazz jam band. Dixon and Rhyne then hired drummer Kenny Phelps and Chicago guitarist Fareed Haque. In 2008 Owl Studios released the debut album Reinvention: The Dixon-Rhyne Project.

References

American jazz ensembles from Indiana
Owl Studios artists